Komodo Armament D7 PMR SA is a semi-automatic assault rifle produced by PT Komodo Armament Indonesia. The rifle is using 7.62x51 mm NATO ammunition. Like other Komodo Armament rifles, D7 PMR SA rifle is manufactured using polymer material, with cerakote or hard anodize finish. Unlike the D5 assault rifle with gas and piston-driven operation, the D7 PMR SA is gas-operated only. PMR SA stands for "Precision Marksman Rifle Single Action". It is also referred to as DMR semi auto D7, where the DMR stands for "Designated Marksman Rifle".

It has 2 picatinny rails at the 12 and 6 o'clock positions, but an additional 2 can be added at 9 and 3 o'clock using the rail integration system (RIS) on the hand guard. Like the D5, the barrel cover (hand guard) is made with several open cavities, making heat dissipation from the barrel faster. The barrel cover model is also designed to be lightweight but rigid. For the buttstock, D7 uses a polymer telescoping stock. Polymer material is also used in the magazine, which contains 30 rounds.

See also 

 Pindad SS3, Pindad battle rifle
 Pindad SS2, current Indonesian army service rifle
 M4 Carbine, US service rifle
Komodo Armament D7CH, sniper rifle made by the same manufacturer

References 

Post–Cold War military equipment of Indonesia
Assault rifles of Indonesia
7.62×51mm NATO rifles